Abdellah Guennoun ( ʻAbd Allāh Gannūn, Born 16 September 1908 in Fes – died 9 July 1989 in Tangier) was an influential Moroccan writer, historian, essayist, poet, academic, administrator, journalist, and faqīh. He was one of the leaders of the Nahda movement in Morocco, and served as the general secretary of the League of Moroccan Religious Scholars.

He is known for writing an-Nubūgh al-Maghribī fī al-adab al-ʻArabī (Moroccan Intellect in Arabic Literature), a three-volume anthology of Moroccan literature in Arabic that was banned by the French Protectorate.

Guennoun also served as a member of a number of linguistic, educational, and Islamic academies and organizations in places such as Rabat, Cairo, Damascus, Baghdad, and Amman.

Early life 
Abdallah Guennoun was born in Fes in 1908 to a family of noble Idrissid lineage long associated with knowledge. His family moved from Fes to Tangier in 1914.

He had a traditional Islamic education, memorizing the Quran and some Hadith. With access to international books in Tangier, he also taught himself Spanish and French.

Career
Guennoun began his writing career early; he published in the newspaper Idhar al-Haqq in 1927 when he was 20 years old. He also wrote for publications such as the Egyptian literary magazine Arrissalah. 

He became active and influential in the flourishing intellectual and cultural scene in Tetuan, and he published many of his works there. As part of this intellectual circle in Tetuan, he was involved in the first nationalist publication in Morocco, as-Salaam, which published its first issue October 1933.

Abdallah Guennoun was well-connected, associated with Said Hajji in the French area, Mohammed Daoud in the Spanish area, and Shakib Arslan in the Mashriq. Guennoun became involved with the Moroccan Action Committee in 1934.

He opened the first of the Moroccan free schools in Tangier, the Free Abdallah Guennoun School, and worked as a teacher in 1936.

He was the editor in-chief of a monthly Islamic publication called Lisaan ad-Din in the 1940s and published a number of articles. He also served as the general secretary of al-Mithaq, a journal put out by the faculty of al-Qarawiyyin University.

He refused the support Mohammed Ben Aarafa, the puppet monarch chosen by France to replace Muhammad V, whom France had exiled.

Guennoun was, among other members of the Mococcan Nationalist Movement including Allal al-Fassi, Abdelkhalek Torres, Abdallah Ibrahim, a member of a generation of Moroccan intellectuals brought together the political and the cultural, and who criticized the reform movement in the country, arguing that there can be "no reform without independence."

an-Nubūgh al-Maghribī
In 1938, he published an-Nubūgh al-Maghribī fī al-adab al-ʻArabī (Moroccan Intellect in Arabic Literature), his three-volume anthology of Moroccan literature. This anthology indexed and contextualized major Moroccan works of literature written in Arabic, and led to the development of a Moroccan literary canon. Affirming both Morocco's contributions to Arabic literature and the long tradition of Arabic literature in Morocco, an-Nubūgh al-Maghribī was seen as a nationalist reaction to colonialism. It was banned by the authorities of the French Protectorate, and could not be brought into the area under French colonial control, nor could it be sold, displayed, or distributed there. Spain, however, was receptive of the work; an-Nubūgh al-Maghribī was translated into Spanish and Abdallah Guennoun was granted an honorary doctorate from a university in Madrid.

He held a number of different positions. In 1937, he was made director of the Khalifi Institute, then professor at the High Institute of Religion and the College of Theology in Tetuan. He held the office of Minister of Justice in the Khalifi government from 1954 to 1956.

He became a member of the Arab Academy of Damascus in 1956, the Academy of the Arabic Language in Cairo in 1961, the League of Moroccan Religious Scholars, the al-Quds Scientific Commission in 1973, the Muslim World League in Mecca as a founding member in 1974, the Jordan Academy of Arabic in 1978, the Iraqi Academy of Sciences in 1979, and the Academy of the Kingdom of Morocco in 1980.

In 1981, he founded al-Ihyaa' ( The Revival), a journal published by the Association of Moroccan Academics focusing on Islamic theological sciences and thought from an open, critical perspective.

Abdallah Guennoun passed away July 9, 1989 in Tangier.

Notable works 
Abdallah Guennoun's works include poetry, literary fiction, and history. Some of his most notable works include:

 an-Nubūgh al-Maghribī fī al-adab al-ʻArabī (Moroccan Intellect in Arabic Literature), 1st ed. al-Matba'a al-Mehdia. 1938; 2nd ed. Dar al-Kitab al-Lubnani. 1961; 1st ed. Dar al-Kutub al-Ilmiyah. 2014.
 Umarāʼunā al-Shuʻarāʼ ( Our Poet Princes). 1941.
 al-Qudwat ul-Samiya lil-Nashi'at il-Islamiya. 1945
 Wahat al-Fikr ( The Oasis of Thought). 1948.
 Dīwān Malik Gharnaṭah Yusuf al-Thalith ( The Poetry of Yusuf III, King of Granada). 1958.
 Aḥādīth ʻan al-Adab al-Maghribī al-Ḥadīth ( On Modern Moroccan Literature). 1964.
 Mafāhīm Islāmīyah ( Islamic Concepts). 1964.
 al-Muntakhab min Shiʻr Ibn Zākūr ( A Selection of the Poetry of Ibn Zakur). 1966.
 Luqmān al-Ḥakīm ( Luqman the Wise). 1969.
 Adab al-Fuqahāʼ ( Literature of the Theologians). 1970.
 Naẓrah fī Munjid al-Adab wa-al-ʻUlum. 1972.
 al-Taʻāshīb. 1975.
 Dhikrayāt Mashāhīr Rijāl al-Maghrib. 2010.

Legacy
Abdellah Guennoun's personal library, which he donated in 1985 to the City of Tangier,  has been housed since his death in the former building of the Moroccan Debt Administration.

Notes

References
Memoirs of important Men of Morocco: Ibn Battuta, Rabat:Islamic Educational, Scientific and Cultural Organisation, 1996
Dhikrayat Mashahir Rijal al-Maghrib: Ahmad Zarruq, 1954
Mohammed Tozy, Zakya Daoud, Abdallah Guennoun ou le dernier des Lettrés. LAMALIF (188), 1987:05, 13-16
Rom Landau, Portrait of Tangier, ed. Hale, 1952, chapter 30: "Guennoun"
CHAYBI, Ahmed. Al-Dirâsa al `adabiyya fî al-Magrib: Al-ustâdh `Abd`allâh Kanűn numudhadj, Tánger: Madrasa al-Malik Fahd al-Uliyâ li-l-Tardjuma, 1991.
HABABI, Fatima al-Djamiya al. Abd allâh Kanűn, Mohammedia: Mat:ba`a Fadhâla, 1991.
HABABI, Fatima al-Djamiya al. Abd allâh Kanűn, Casablanca: Mu`asasas Űnâ, 1997.

External links
Afrique info (in French)  (retrieved Feb. 13, 2009)
Tangier.free.fr (in French)  (retrieved Feb. 13, 2009)

Moroccan writers
Moroccan essayists
Moroccan male writers
Male essayists
1908 births
1989 deaths
People from Fez, Morocco
20th-century Moroccan historians
Member of the Academy of the Kingdom of Morocco
Moroccan academics
Moroccan scholars
20th-century essayists